is a Japanese professional footballer who plays as an attacking midfielder or a winger for Shonan Bellmare in the J1 League.

Club statistics
Updated to 9 July 2022.

 1 includes J. League Championship, Japanese Super Cup and Suruga Bank Championship appearances.

National team statistics

Honours

Gamba Osaka

J1 League – 2014
J2 League – 2013
Emperor's Cup – 2014, 2015
J.League Cup – 2014
Japanese Super Cup – 2015

Kawasaki Frontale
J1 League – 2017, 2018
J.League Cup – 2019
Japanese Super Cup – 2019

References

External links

Profile at Kawasaki Frontale

1989 births
Living people
Kwansei Gakuin University alumni
Association football people from Nara Prefecture
Japanese footballers
J1 League players
J2 League players
J3 League players
Gamba Osaka players
Gamba Osaka U-23 players
Kawasaki Frontale players
Nagoya Grampus players
Shonan Bellmare players
Japan international footballers
Association football midfielders